Kumbakonam Gopalu is a 1998 Indian Tamil-language film directed by Keyaar, produced by A. V. Subba Rao, and starring Pandiarajan, Mayoori, Janagaraj and Thyagu. It is a remake of the 1991 Kannada film Gauri Ganesha. Child actor Mahendran won the Tamil Nadu State Film Award for Best Child Artist.

Plot 

Gopal is a petty trickster who cheats and lies to make a false living. One day, he turns himself into an hospital, faking an abdominal issue, solely to get free lodging and food, and also his love interest Geetha. At the hospital Gopal comes across a recent patient named Gauri who has died of heart failure. Gopal gets a sudden idea and he decides to take her belongings and make some money of them, but instead finds her diary. He realizes that Gauri has come across 3 men who had significant influence in her life. The first man was her former boss who had proposed indecently to sleep with her. The second man wanted her to pretend that they are married to fool his parents in return for money for her heart treatment. The last man is a friend of the 2nd man, and thought that he had slept with her in a drunken state. The truth is that none of the men had any physical contact with her. Gopal devises a plan to extract money from these men and their families. He writes letters to them stating that Gauri has given birth to their son and named him Ganesh. After a series of funny events, (such as the three booking almost neighbouring rooms on the same floor of the same hotel) all the three come to meet Gopal on the same day, and the film ends when Gopal blackmails them into submission.

Cast 

Pandiarajan
Mayuri (debut)
Janagaraj
Kavitha
Thyagu
Alex
Singamuthu
Vinu Chakravarthy
Master Mahendran
Typist Gopu
Omakuchi Narasimhan
Loose Mohan
Sangita Madhavan Nair in Guest appearance

Soundtrack 
The music was composed by Ilaiyaraaja. The song "Oru Nandhavanam" was reused version of Ilayaraja's own Malayalam song "Manikuttikurumbulla" from Malayalam film Kaliyoonjal.

Release
A critic from Deccan Herald wrote "I can’t find a word that can aptly describe this film — vulgar, tacky, obscene would all fit, but its worse than all that put together. This is one of those really disgusting films that leaves a stain on your mind". In contrast, a reviewer from The Hindu wrote the director's "approach in the second- half however enlivens the film".

References

External links 
 

1990 films
1990s Tamil-language films
1998 films
Films scored by Ilaiyaraaja
Indian comedy films
Tamil remakes of Kannada films